Galatasaray HDI Sigorta is the women's volleyball section of Galatasaray SK, a major sports club in Istanbul, Turkey. Galatasaray play their matches in the 7000-seat arena TVF Burhan Felek Sport Hall.

Previous names
Due to sponsorship, the club have competed under the following names:

 Galatasaray (1922–2010)
 Galatasaray Medical Park (2010–2011)
 Galatasaray (2011–2012)
 Galatasaray Daikin (2012–2016)
 Galatasaray (2016–2019)
 Galatasaray HDI Sigorta (2019–present)

History

Early history
Galatasaray Women's Volleyball Branch was established in 1922. The team won the Istanbul Women's Volleyball League 7 times and the Turkish Women's Volleyball Championship 5 times. However, the team does not have a Sultans League championship.

1980 Era
As a result of Galatasaray (men's volleyball team) becoming the champion in the league in the 1986-1987 season, the volleyball branch managers of the period formed an ambitious team for the women's volleyball team and entered the 1987-1988 season. They finished second.

2000 Era
In the following years, with the establishment of more establishment clubs, it could not be as successful in volleyball as before, and as a result of these processes, once due to the economic crisis, the team was closed for a year while it was in the Sultans League in the 2003-2004 season. What has risen. However, after 4 seasons, this time 3 weeks before the end of the league, they were defeated by TED Ankara College 3-0 and relegated to the 1st league in the 2006-2007 season for the first time in its history and was promoted to the Sultans League again the following season. The women's volleyball team, which has had to compete in the 1st league twice in its history, has become a team that plays for the championship in the league again and consistently participates in the European cups every year, as a result of the efforts of the administrations coming after this process to raise the branch. 

The team, which came in 3rd place in the CEV Women's Challenge Cup in the 2009-2010 season, changed its name to Galatasaray Medical Park Women's Volleyball Team as a result of the name sponsorship made with Medical Park in the 2010-2011 season and continued its struggle in the league. However, the paths parted with Medical Park after one season and the next season, the team that competed as the Galatasaray Women's Volleyball Team played in the final with Italy's Unendo Yamamay Busto Arsizio team in the Women's CEV Cup for the first time in its history and won the second place in the final by losing in the gold set. has done. At the end of the same season, the team that participated in the CEV Women's Champions League by receiving a wild cart, advanced to the next round as a result of the group matches it played and was entitled to organize the final four in the CEV Women's Champions League.

2010 Era
Having signed a name sponsorship agreement with Daikin at the beginning of the 2012-2013 season, the team hosted the final four of the CEV Women's Champions League as Galatasaray Daikin Women's Volleyball Team and finished the tournament 4th.

In the 2014-2015 season, Galatasaray Daikin Women's Volleyball Team said goodbye to Europe by losing to its rival in the semi-finals of the Women's CEV Cup, and then lost to VakıfBank 3-2 in the Turkish Super Cup and said goodbye to the cup in the semi-finals. In the league, the team finished the regular season in the 4th place and matched with its rival Nilüfer Belediyespor in the quarter finals. By defeating their opponent 2-0 in the quarter-finals and finishing in the 4th place in the play-off final stage, the team qualified to compete in the Women's CEV Cup next season.

Contrary to previous seasons, the team started the 2015-2016 season with an infrastructure-weighted squad, surprising all authorities, and continued on its way in the league and Europe with full reins, winning all 10 matches until the final match in the Women's CEV Cup and matched with the Russian representative Dinamo Krasnodar in the final. . Having won the first match of the series 3-2 at home, the team lost the second match in Russia 3-0 and had to say goodbye for the second time in the last match of a final leg in this cup. In the league, the team that was among the top 4 teams completed the group in the last place and won the right to compete in the Women's CEV Cup for the next season.

Starting from the 2016-2017 season, the team parted ways with its sponsor Daikin and decided to continue its struggle as the Galatasaray Women's Volleyball Team. 

Completing the league in the 4th place in the 2016-2017 season, the team lost to its arch-rival Fenerbahçe in the play-off series and completed the play-offs in the 2nd place and earned the right to compete in the CEV Women's Champions League for the next season. He said goodbye to the cup after losing 3-2 to Bursa Büyükşehir Belediyesi in Turkish Women's Volleyball Cup. In the Women's CEV Cup, she lost to Dynamo Kazan in the semi-finals by 3-0 in both matches and said goodbye to the tournament.

Finishing the league in the 3rd place in the regular season in the 2017-2018 season, the team finished the play-offs in the 4th place. In the Cup, he lost 3-1 to Eczacıbaşı VitrA in the semi-finals and said goodbye to the organization. In the CEV Women's Champions League, the team reached the final four and finished the season in the last place in the finals of four.

In the 2018-2019 season, the team, which finished the league and play-offs in the 4th place, said goodbye to the cup and also to the semi-finals. In Europe, she finished the season by saying goodbye to the Women's CEV Cup with the golden set in the quarter-finals. 

Before the 2019-2020 season, the team agreed with HDI Sigorta to be the name sponsor and started the season as Galatasaray HDI Sigorta Women's Volleyball Team. Galatasaray HDI Sigorta Women's Volleyball Team finished the league in the 4th place in the regular season in the 2019-2020 season. However, after the decision taken by Turkish Volleyball Federation on May 11, 2020 due to the COVID-19 pandemic, the league, whose play-off stage was not played, was registered with this ranking, and the champion or the relegated team was not determined in the season. Cup Volley to be played due to the pandemic has also been canceled for the 2019-2020 season. In Europe, the team that competed in the Women's CEV Cup said goodbye to the cup in the last 16 rounds before the pandemic.

2020 Era
In the 2020-2021 season, he completed the Sultans League in the 6th place at the end of the regular season matches, and as a result of the 5th & 8th play-off matches he played, he completed the season in the 7th place and could not participate in the European Cups after many years. As a result of the Cup Volley matches she played, she lost to her opponent VakıfBank 3-0 in the semi-finals and said goodbye to the cup. She achieved her greatest success in the season by playing the final of the Women's CEV Cup for the 3rd time in its history, however, as in the previous finals, she lost to her rival Saugella Monza and lost the cup as a result of a final and came 2nd.

Honours

European competitions
  CEV Cup
 Runners-up (3): 2011–12, 2015–16, 2020–21

  CEV Challenge Cup
 Third place (2): 1996–97, 2009–10

Domestic competitions
 Turkish Women's Volleyball League
 Runners-up (1): 2016–17
 Third place (4): 2014–15, 2015–16, 2017–18, 2018–19

 Turkish Women's Volleyball Championship (defunct)
 Winners (5): 1961, 1962, 1963, 1964, 1966
 Runners-up (7): 1959, 1960, 1967, 1974, 1976, 1977, 1978
 Third place (5): 1958, 1965, 1969, 1975, 1979

 Turkish Cup
 Runners-up (1): 2011–12
 Third place (1): 2012–13

 Turkish Super Cup
 Runners-up (1): 2011–12

Regional competitions
 Istanbul League (defunct)
 Winners (7): 1959–60, 1961–62, 1962–63, 1963–64, 1964–65, 1965–66, 1977–78
 Runners-up (9): 1956–57, 1957–58, 1958–59, 1960–61, 1966–67, 1967–68, 1968–69, 1975–76, 1976–77
 Third place (9): 1969–70, 1970–71, 1971–72, 1972–73, 1973–74, 1974–75, 1978–79, 1979–80, 1980–81

Technical Staff

Team roster

Season by season

Previous

Notable players

Domestic Players

 Ayça Naz İhtiyaroğlu
 Aslı Kalaç
 Bihter Dumanoğlu
 Cansu Çetin
 Deniz Hakyemez
 Dilara Bilge
 Derya Çayırgan
 Ebru Elhan
 Elif Ağca
 Ezgi Güç
 Gizem Güreşen
 Güldeniz Önal
 Gamze Alikaya
 Hande Baladın
 Hazal Selin Arifoğlu
 Meryem Boz
 Merve Dalbeler
 Natalia Hanikoğlu
 Neriman Özsoy
 Neslihan Keskin
 Nilay Karaağaç
 Nilay Konar
 Nihan Güneyligil
 Neslihan Demir
 Özlem Özçelik
 Özgenur Yurtdagülen
 Seray Altay
 Su Zent
 Selime İlyasoğlu
 Sinem Barut

European Players

 Charlotte Leys

 Dobriana Rabadžieva
 Emiliya Pachova
 Hristina Ruseva
 Penka Natova

 Marina Miletić
 Vesna Jelic

 Anthí Vasilantonáki

 Caterina Bosetti 
 Eleonora Lo Bianco
 Nadia Centoni
 Simona Gioli

 Irina Ilchenko
 Marina Pankova  
 Tatiana Kosheleva

 Malin Ericsson

 Brižitka Molnar
 Ivana Đerisilo
 Nataša Krsmanović
 Slađana Erić

 Olga Petrashko
 Olesia Rykhliuk
 Youlia Kovtun

Non-European Players

  Elizabeth Hintemann
  Erika Coimbra
  Valeska Menezes

 Stacey Gordon

 Rosir Calderón

 Hu Wen Yue

 Saori Kimura
 Yuko Sano

 Patricia Soto

 Karina Ocasio

  Cursty Jackson
  Ogonna Nnamani
  Ruth Burdine
  Sherridan Atkinson

Players written in italic still play for the club.

Former coaches

Team captains

Home halls
This is a list of the home halls the senior team played at in the recent years.

See also
 Galatasaray S.K. (men's volleyball)
 Turkey women's national volleyball team

References

External links
 Official Galatasaray Volleyball Branch Website 
 Galatasaray HDI Sigorta » players __ Women Volleybox.net 
 Turkish Volleyball Federastion official website 

Galatasaray S.K. (women's volleyball)

Women's volleyball teams in Turkey
1922 establishments in the Ottoman Empire
Volleyball clubs established in 1922